The Bleeding is a 2009 action horror film directed by Charlie Picerni and starring Michael Matthias, Vinnie Jones, DMX, and Michael Madsen.

Premise
An ex-Army Ranger searching for the killer of his parents discovers a family of vampires in a former chemical weapons factory-turned-nightclub.

Cast
 Michael Matthias as Shawn Black
 Vinnie Jones as Cain, The King of The Vampire Family
 Michael Madsen as Father Roy
 DMX as "Tagg"
 Armand Assante as Jake Plummer
 William McNamara as Dan Williams
 Pittsburgh Slim as "Crash"
 Rachelle Leah as Lena
 Kat Von D as Vanya
 Sindy Rush as Katya

Production
Filming took place in Wilmington, North Carolina.

Release
The film premiered on November 14, 2009.

References

External links
 
 
 
 
 Interview with Charlie Picerni about "The Bleeding"

2009 films
2000s action horror films
2009 horror films
American action horror films
American supernatural horror films
American vampire films
Films scored by Justin Burnett
Films shot in North Carolina
American films about revenge
American exploitation films
American splatter films
2000s English-language films
2000s American films